Glyptorhagada bordaensis is a species of air-breathing land snails, terrestrial pulmonate gastropod mollusks in the family Camaenidae. This species is endemic to Australia.

References

Gastropods of Australia
bordaensis
Vulnerable fauna of Australia
Gastropods described in 1880
Endemic fauna of Australia
Taxa named by George French Angas
Taxonomy articles created by Polbot